Mendenhall may refer to:

People
Mendenhall (surname)

Places

United Kingdom
Mendenhall (Minoll), Wiltshire, England

United States
Mendenhall Glacier, near Juneau, Alaska
Mendenhall Lake, near Juneau, Alaska
Mendenhall River, near Juneau, Alaska
Mendenhall Valley, near Juneau, Alaska
Mendenhall, Mississippi
Mendenhall Springs, California

Other
Mendenhall Observatory, Stillwater, Oklahoma, USA 
Mendenhall Order, a decision to change the system of weights and measures to the metric system
Mendenhall Homeplace, a historic 1811 Quaker Homeplace in Jamestown, North Carolina, USA
United States v. Mendenhall, a 1980 decision of the United States Supreme Court

See also
 Mildenhall (disambiguation)